Argun River may refer to 

Argun River (Caucasus), in Georgia and Russia
Argun River (Asia), part of the Russia–China border